Chas Symonds (born 8 July 1982) is an English welterweight boxer.

He is the former BBBofC Southern Area welterweight title holder, but lost his title after losing to Luke Graham from Cornwall by TKO April 2005. Symonds did not fight for over three years following his title defeat, but returned to the ring in June 2008 to defeat Luke Graham the Worlds hardest scaffolder.

References

External links
 
 Profile at BritishBoxing.net
 Chas Symonds in training

1982 births
Living people
People from Croydon
English male boxers
Welterweight boxers
Boxers from Greater London